Katherine "Kay" Krill was the President and Chief Executive Officer of ANN INC., a wholly owned subsidiary of Ascena Retail Group from 2000 - 2015.  ANN INC. comprises several leading women's specialty and apparel retail brands.  It operates 1,034 Ann Taylor, Ann Taylor Factory, LOFT, LOFT Outlet and Lou & Grey stores in the U.S., Puerto Rico, Canada and online.

Education
Krill received her B.A. in psychology and economics from Agnes Scott College in Atlanta, Georgia.

Career
2015 marked Krill's tenth anniversary as CEO of ANN INC., a position she assumed eleven years after she joined the company. She was named President of ANN INC. and a member of the Board of Directors in 2004. During her tenure, Krill established ANN INC. as a financially successful company and helped evolve the Ann Taylor brand. She has been credited with the development and growth of the company's LOFT concept, which she launched in 1998. LOFT's business now exceeds $1.5 billion and continues to be one of the fastest-growing concepts in women's apparel. Under Krill's leadership, the company launched another new brand, Lou & Grey, in 2014. In 2015, Krill transitioned from President and CEO of ANN INC. to Ascena's Board of Directors. 

Krill also successfully steered ANN INC. through the 2008 recession, restoring its share price to the mid-40 range after the global economic downturn drove the stock as low as $3. In 2014, she increased ANN INC.'s sales 2% to $2.5 billion, rebounding 36% from fiscal year 2010.  Most recently, she led ANN INC. through its successful sale to Ascena in August 2015.

Krill joined ANN INC. in 1994 as Merchandising Vice President. She was subsequently promoted to Senior Vice President of Merchandising. One year after launching LOFT, Krill was named Executive Vice President, Merchandising and Design for LOFT; and in 2001, she became the President of the LOFT division. Prior to ANN INC., Krill served at Talbots and Mark Shale. She began her career at Macy's.

Corporate social responsibility and charitable initiatives
Under Krill, ANN INC. implemented a series of charitable and corporate social responsibility initiatives and partnerships as part of its broader mission to help women put their best selves forward every day. These initiatives and partnerships support women around the globe.  Since 2005, the company has raised and donated more than $50 million to support causes important to women and children through the ANN Cares platform of charitable initiatives.

In 2015, ANN INC. celebrated more than a decade of committed partnership with The Breast Cancer Research Foundation, which aims to advance research to improve the lives of women who are treated for or living with breast cancer. In 2014, ANN INC. donated more than $4.3 million to fully fund 17 research grants that support lifesaving science in the fight against breast cancer across the U.S. and in Canada. Additionally, ANN INC. raised and donated over $5.6 million to support St. Jude Children's Research Hospital.

As CEO, Krill has also prioritized initiatives and strategies that develop and empower the next generation of female leaders. Together with the Vital Voices Global Partnership, ANN INC. established the ANNpower Vital Voices Initiative to provide leadership training, grants and mentorships to junior and senior high school students. Each year, the company selects 50 girls who submit an idea to help their community improve and equips them with the knowledge they need to develop their projects. Since launching the program in 2011, ANN INC. estimates that it has positively impacted 45,000 people in 15 countries around the world.

The Responsibly ANN 100,000 Women Commitment, a multi-year program operated by ANN INC., aims to positively impact 100,000 women in the company's supply chain by 2018 by providing them with health and financial literacy training through BSR's HERproject. The HERproject empowers female workers to take ownership of their health and well-being and enables them to have more control over their finances, which benefits their future and the future of their families. In 2014, the Clinton Global Initiative recognized the 100,000 Women Commitment as a "Commitment to Action" for its emphasis on improving women's health and having a positive impact on apparel supply chains.

Board memberships
In addition to her service on the ANN INC. and Ascena Boards, Krill has served on the board of the National Retail Federation, the world's largest retail trade association, since 2011. She is also a member of both the Breast Cancer Research Foundation Board of Directors and the Board of Trustees for St. Luke's School (New Canaan, CT).

Awards
In 2013 The Breast Cancer Research Foundation awarded Krill the Sandra Taub Humanitarian Award, acknowledging that, under her guidance, ANN INC., has been one of the most committed and vocal supporters of BCRF. That same year, Krill was honored at the Fashion Institute of Technology's Annual Gala for her contributions to the fashion industry.

Other honors include St. Jude's 2012 Corporate Partner of the Year award, which Krill accepted on behalf of ANN INC. In 2012, Krill delivered remarks at her alma mater's 123rd Commencement, where she received an honorary doctorate degree. She was also a 2011 honoree at the Girl Scout Council of Greater New York's 36th Annual Smart Cookie Gala.

Crain's has consistently recognized Krill as one of the "50 Most Powerful Women in New York" from 2007 through 2015.

Personal life

A native of North Carolina, Krill currently resides in Connecticut with her twin sons.

References

Living people
Women corporate executives
People from North Carolina
Agnes Scott College people
Year of birth missing (living people)